Discursive dilemma or doctrinal paradox is a paradox in social choice theory. The paradox is that aggregating judgments with majority voting can result in self-contradictory judgments.

Consider a community voting on road repairs asked three questions; the repairs go ahead if all three answers are 'Yes'. The questions are: "Are the roads important?", "Is the weather right for road repair?" and "Are there available funds for repairs?" Imagine that three (non-overlapping) groups of 20% of people vote 'No' for each question, and everyone else votes 'Yes'. Then each question has an 80% agreement of 'Yes', so the repairs go ahead. However, now consider the situation where the community are asked one question: "Are all three conditions (importance, weather and funds) met?" Now 60% of people disagree with one of these conditions, so only 40% agree on a 'Yes' vote. In this case, the repairs do not go ahead. Thus the road repair team gets different feedback depending on how they poll their community.

Philosopher Philip Pettit believes the discursive dilemma makes it impossible to make simple statements about the beliefs of a collective.

Overview
Princeton philosopher Philip Pettit says there are hidden challenges of describing the group as though it were a single individual – a metaphorical agent – the way the law sometimes talks about corporations. It is a mistake, he says, to think things can be that simple.

In reality, it can be quite difficult to construct a model of the "group mind" by merely asking for a majority opinion. This is because contradictory conceptions of a group can emerge depending on the type of questioning that is chosen.

To see how, imagine that a three-member court must decide whether someone is liable for a breach of contract. For example, a lawn caretaker is accused of violating a contract not to mow over the land-owner's roses. The judges have to decide which of the following propositions are true:
 P: the defendant did a certain action (i.e. did the caretaker mow over the roses?);
 Q: the defendant had a contractual obligation not to do that action (i.e. was there a contract not to mow over the roses?);
 C: the defendant is liable.
Additionally, all judges accept the proposition . In other words, the judges agree that a defendant should be liable if and only if the two propositions, P and Q, are both true.

Each judge could make consistent (non-contradictory) judgments, and the paradox will still emerge. Most judges could think P is true, and most judges could think Q is true. In this example, that means they would vote that the caretaker probably mowed over the roses, and that the contract did indeed forbid that action. This suggests the caretaker is liable. 

At the same time, most judges may think that P and Q are not both true at once. In this example, that means most judges conclude the caretaker is not liable. The table above illustrates how majority decisions can contradict (because the judges vote in favor of the premises, and yet reject the conclusion). The paradox lies in choosing between two group liability opinions.

Explanation
This dilemma results because an actual decision-making procedure might be premise-based or conclusion-based. In a premise-based procedure, the judges decide by voting whether the conditions for liability are met. In a conclusion-based procedure, the judges decide directly whether the defendant should be liable. In the above formulation, the paradox is that the two procedures do not necessarily lead to the same result; the two procedures can even lead to opposite results.

Pettit believes that the lesson of this paradox is that there is no simple way to aggregate individual opinions into a single, coherent "group entity". These ideas are relevant to sociology, which endeavors to understand and predict group behaviour. Petitt warns that we need to understand groups because they can be very powerful, can effect greater change, and yet the group as a whole may not have a strong conscience (see Diffusion of responsibility). He says we sometimes fail to hold groups (e.g. corporations) responsible because of the difficulties described above. Collective responsibility is important to sort out, and Petitt insists that groups should have limited rights, and various obligations and checks on their power.

The discursive dilemma (which concerns general proposition sets) can be seen as a generalization of the Condorcet paradox (which concerns preference sets, a kind of proposition set). Furthermore, the Condorcet paradox can be generalized to Arrow's theorem. List and Pettit argue that the discursive dilemma can be likewise generalized to a sort of "List–Pettit theorem". Their theorem states that the inconsistencies remain for any aggregation method which meets a few natural conditions.

References 
 List, C. and Pettit, P.: Aggregating Sets of Judgments: Two Impossibility Results Compared, Synthese 140 (2004) 207–235

External links 
 
 Judgment aggregation: an introduction and bibliography of the discursive dilemma by Christian List

Social choice theory
Paradoxes
Dilemmas
Social epistemology